Pijiño or Pijiño del Carmen is a town and municipality of the Magdalena Department in northern Colombia.

References

External links
 Pijino official website
 Gobernacion del Magdalena - Pijiño

Municipalities of Magdalena Department